KIFT (106.3 FM, "Lift 106") is a radio station broadcasting a top 40/CHR music format. Licensed to Kremmling, Colorado, United States, the station is currently owned by Patricia MacDonald Garber and Peter Benedetti, through licensee AlwaysMountainTime, LLC.

History
The station was assigned the call sign KSKE on 1983-08-22. On 1987-09-10, the station changed its call sign to KTLD-FM, on 1988-03-16 to KRKM, on 2004-04-23 to KKHI, on 2005-09-07, to KZMV, and on 2011-05-11 to the current KIFT.

Previous logo

References

External links

IFT
Contemporary hit radio stations in the United States
Radio stations established in 1983